Lauderi Parish was an administrative territorial entity of the now defunct Ludza District in Latvia. As a result of the 2009 administrative divisions reform of Latvia; Lauderi Parish was absorbed by Zilupe Municipality. Since 1 July 2021, Lauderi Parish is part of Ludza Municipality.

References

Ludza Municipality
Parishes of Latvia
Latgale